William Howell Smathers (January 7, 1891September 24, 1955) was a Democratic United States Senator from New Jersey, serving from 1937 to 1943.

Biography
Smathers was born on January 7, 1891, on a plantation near Waynesville, North Carolina.

He attended public school and Washington and Lee University in Lexington, Virginia. Smathers was graduated from the law department of the University of North Carolina at Chapel Hill in 1911 and was admitted to the bar in 1912, commencing practice in Atlantic City, New Jersey, where he served as a judge of the common pleas court of Atlantic City from 1922 to 1932. Additionally, he served as the first assistant Attorney General of New Jersey, from 1934 to 1936. Smathers was elected to the New Jersey Senate in 1935. He served one term in the U.S. Senate, losing his bid for reelection in 1942. He returned to his law practice in Atlantic City until his retirement to Waynesville.

He died on September 24, 1955, in Asheville, North Carolina.

Legacy
He was the uncle of Florida Senator George Smathers.

References

External links 

 

1891 births
1955 deaths
People from Haywood County, North Carolina
Democratic Party New Jersey state senators
Politicians from Atlantic City, New Jersey
Democratic Party United States senators from New Jersey
Washington and Lee University alumni
University of North Carolina at Chapel Hill alumni